William James Fullerton (20 June 1888 – ?) was an Australian politician. He was a lawyer before entering politics. In 1913 Fullerton was elected to the Tasmanian House of Assembly as a Liberal member for Denison, holding his seat until his retirement in 1919. Fullerton died in England.

References

1888 births
Year of death missing
Commonwealth Liberal Party politicians
Members of the Tasmanian House of Assembly
Place of birth missing
Tasmanian lawyers